Aazhi is a 1985 Indian Malayalam-language film directed and produced by Boban Kunchacko and written by E. Mosus. The film stars Thilakan, Captain Raju, Baby Shalini and Chithra in the lead roles. The film has musical score by Raj Kamal.

Cast

Thilakan
Captain Raju
Baby Shalini
Chithra
G. K. Pillai
K. R. Vijaya
Kaduvakulam Antony
Kalpana Ayyer
M. G. Soman
Ramu
Shanavas
Raveendran

Soundtrack
The music was composed by Raj Kamal and the lyrics were written by Bichu Thirumala.

References

External links
 

1985 films
Films scored by Raj Kamal
1980s Malayalam-language films